Shemeykino is a rural locality (a village) in Pertsevskoye Rural Settlement, Gryazovetsky District, Vologda Oblast, Russia. The population was 16 as of 2002.

Geography 
Shemeykino is located 32 km northeast of Gryazovets (the district's administrative centre) by road. Pochinok is the nearest rural locality.

References 

Rural localities in Gryazovetsky District